This is a list of properties and districts in Clayton County, Georgia that are listed on the National Register of Historic Places (NRHP).

Current listings

|}

References

Clayton
Buildings and structures in Clayton County, Georgia